Bryan Leonelle Gilmore (born January 21, 1978) is a former American football wide receiver. He played college football at Midwestern State in Wichita Falls, Texas. Gilmore was signed by the Arizona Cardinals as an undrafted free agent in 2000, and has also played for the Miami Dolphins and San Francisco 49ers.

Early years
Gilmore attended Lufkin High School and was a student and a letterman in football. In football, he won All-District honors. He graduated in 1996.

Professional career

Arizona Cardinals
He was signed as an undrafted free agent by the Arizona Cardinals in 2000. He was sent to NFL Europe by the Cardinals in 2000. He played for the Cardinals until 2004.

Miami Dolphins
He played for the Miami Dolphins in 2004 and 2005.

San Francisco 49ers
He was signed as a free agent by the 49ers in 2006. On September 1, 2007, he was released by the 49ers, but was re-signed on October 2.

Seattle Seahawks
On July 25, 2008, Gilmore was signed by the Seattle Seahawks. He was released on August 30, 2008.

References

External links
San Francisco 49ers bio
Seattle Seahawks bio

1978 births
Living people
People from Lufkin, Texas
American football wide receivers
Midwestern State Mustangs football players
Arizona Cardinals players
Miami Dolphins players
San Francisco 49ers players
Seattle Seahawks players
Players of American football from Texas